Villevieille is a commune in the Gard department in southern France.

Geography
The village is located on the banks of the Vidourle.

Climate
The climate is hot-summer Mediterranean (Köppen: Csa). On 28 June 2019, during the June 2019 European heat wave, the temperature reached  in Villevieille, briefly the highest in French meteorological history, before being surpassed by Gallargues-le-Montueux later the same day.

Demography

See also
Communes of the Gard department

References

Communes of Gard